Lake Callabonna is a dry salt lake with little to no vegetation located in the Far North region of South Australia. It is also known as Lake Mulligan.

The lake is an important site for late Pleistocene fossils.  It is within the extent of the Strzelecki Desert Lakes Important Bird Area, identified as such by BirdLife International because of its importance for waterbirds when holding water in the aftermath of floods.

History
The first pastoralists in the area were the Ragless brothers in 1881, who moved there from the northern Flinders Ranges, opening a sheep-run. The station owner in 1892, F. B. Ragless, was shown a number of giant skeletons embedded in the dry surface of the lake, discovered two days before by an Aboriginal station hand named Jackie Nolan.
The South Australian Museum sent a worker, H. Hurst, to investigate the site and four months later the results were delivered to the museum.  After examination of the skeletons an expedition funded by Sir Thomas Elder and E. C. Stirling, director of the South Australian Museum, was organised and Hurst led the team back to the site before being dismissed. After several visits, Stirling and A. H. C. Zietz collected a large number of diprotodon and dromornithidae skeletons. The area was designated a Fossil Reserve in 1901, and access is restricted.

Protected area status

Strzelecki Regional Reserve
The northern end of Lake Callabonna is within the boundary of the Strzelecki Regional Reserve.

Lake Callabonna Fossil Reserve
Lake Callabonna is the location of a site where the “articulated skeletons of Diprotodon,” an extinct genus of marsupial, were found in the late 19th century by the South Australian Museum.  The site is considered to have “a very high palaeontological significance.”  A fossil reserve was dedicated in 1901 under state law which currently in force as of 2002 as the Crown Lands Act 1929 with administrative responsibility lying with the South Australian Museum.  In 2002, it pointed out that the lake received “negligible management effort as a Fossil Reserve under the Crown Lands Act 1929” and that proclamation under the National Parks and Wildlife Act 1972 may provide a higher level of protection against “degradation arising from uncontrolled access.” It was listed on the South Australian Heritage Register on 13 February 1997.

See also

 List of lakes of South Australia
List of fossil parks

References

Callabonna
Pleistocene paleontological sites of Australia
Salt flats of Australia
Far North (South Australia)
Fossil parks in Australia
South Australian Heritage Register